Gustav Fichardt (born 7 July 1965) is a South African former tennis player.

Fichardt qualified for the 1988 Wimbledon Championships – Men's singles losing in the first round to Chris Pridham.

He is head of the Gustav Fichardt Tennis Academy in Bloemfontein, Free State where he has coached Philip Henning, amongst others.

In 2016 he was appointed to the board of Tennis South Africa.

Personal life
Fichardt is married to Isabel Coetzer, the sister of former South African tennis player Amanda Coetzer.

References

External links
 
 

1965 births
Living people
South African male tennis players
White South African people
20th-century South African people